Shebna was the royal steward  (`asher `al ha-bayith, "he who is over the house"; the chief or prime minister of state) in the reign of king Hezekiah of Judah, according to the Hebrew Bible.

Because of his pride he was ejected from his office, and replaced by Eliakim the son of Hilkiah as recorded in Book of Isaiah. Shebna also appears to have been the leader of the party who favored an alliance with Egypt against Assyria.

Biblical accounts

Tomb and inscription

A royal steward's rock-cut tomb discovered in Silwan is conjectured to be Shebna's, although only the term "-yahu" remains legible on the lintel from the tomb that is now kept in the British Museum. The partially preserved inscription was deciphered to read "...yahu who is over the house". The assumption is that Shebna's name may have been pronounced 'Shebna-yahu', the missing name fitting onto the damaged portion of the inscription.

See also
Hezekiah
Siloam Inscription
List of artifacts significant to the Bible
Related Bible parts: 2 Kings 18, 2 Kings 19, Isaiah 22, Isaiah 36, Isaiah 37, Nehemiah 9

References

8th-century BCE Hebrew people
7th-century BCE Jews